Skulte Parish is an administrative unit of Limbaži Municipality, Latvia. It was an administrative unit of Limbaži District.

Towns, villages and settlements of Skulte Parish 
  - parish administrative center
 Skulte

References

External links

Parishes of Latvia
Limbaži Municipality